The 1984 Taça de Angola was the 3rd edition of the Taça de Angola, the second most important and the top knock-out football club competition following the Girabola.

Provincial stage

Benguela

Cuanza Norte

Luanda

Lunda Sul

Malanje

National stage

References

Angola Cup
Taca de Angola
Taca de Angola